The United States two-dollar bill ($2) is a current denomination of United States currency. A portrait of Thomas Jefferson, the third president of the United States (1801–1809), is featured on the obverse of the note. The reverse features an engraving of the circa 1818 painting Declaration of Independence by John Trumbull.

Throughout the $2 bill's pre-1929 life as a large-sized note, it was issued as a United States Note, National Bank Note, Silver Certificate, Treasury or "Coin" Note, and Federal Reserve Bank Note. When U.S. currency was changed to its current size in 1928, the $2 bill was redesigned and issued only as a United States Note. Production continued until , when United States Notes were phased out, and the $2 denomination was discontinued until 1976, when it was reissued as a Federal Reserve Note with a new reverse design.

As a result of banking policies with businesses that have resulted in low production numbers due to lack of use, two-dollar bills do not circulate as widely as other denominations of U.S. currency. This comparative scarcity in circulation, coupled with a lack of public knowledge that the bill is still in production and circulation, has also inspired urban legends about its authenticity and value and has occasionally created problems for those trying to use the bill to make purchases. The apparent scarcity of the $2 bill, in spite of its production figures, also indicates that large numbers of the notes are removed from circulation and collected by many people who believe the bill to be rarer and more valuable than it actually is.

Denomination overview
Authorized under an act by the United States Congress, the first two-dollar bill was issued in March 1862 and the denomination was continuously used until 1966; by that time, the United States Note was the only remaining class of U.S. currency to which the two-dollar bill was assigned. While the  denomination had been issued simultaneously as a Federal Reserve Note, a United States Note and a Silver Certificate, the  denomination was not immediately reassigned to the Federal Reserve Note class of United States currency, thus was fully discontinued. The Treasury cited low usage of the two-dollar bill as the reason for not immediately resuming use of the denomination. Production of the two-dollar denomination was resumed in December, 1975, and the two-dollar bill was finally reissued in the spring of 1976 as a Federal Reserve Note with a new reverse design featuring John Trumbull's depiction of the drafting of the United States Declaration of Independence, replacing the previous design of Monticello. The two-dollar note has remained a current denomination of U.S. currency since that time.

However, due to their limited use, two-dollar notes are not printed as frequently in a new series as other denominations, which are produced according to demand. Most bill acceptors found in vending machines, self checkout lanes, transit systems, and other automated kiosks are configured to accommodate two-dollar bills, even if the fact is not stated on the label. Although they are generally available at most banks, two-dollar notes are usually not handed out except upon specific request by the customer, and may require the teller to make a trip to the vault, or order the desired amount if not present at the branch.

Rarity
Printing  bills is half as expensive for the government as printing  notes, since they both cost the same amount (6.2 cents per bill) to manufacture, but the public has not circulated them as widely. During the Great Depression, few Americans had enough money to require  notes. In the middle of the 20th century,  bills were often used for betting on horse racing, tips at strip clubs, and allegedly for bribery when politicians were seeking votes (though this is possibly an urban legend), and supposedly acquired a negative reputation. During World War II and later, US servicemen were frequently paid with  bills, and as a result, the notes often were used at USO clubs, post exchanges,  commissaries, and canteens. Many people believe that the 1976 series $2 note with its unusual reverse design was a special, limited issue produced for the United States Bicentennial; this, combined with the earlier discontinuation of the denomination, gave the impression these notes might be valuable as collector's items, and contributed to hoarding. Today, the general public is still largely unfamiliar with the notes because they are not widely circulated and continue to be hoarded.

The common misconception that the  note is no longer being produced also remains, though  notes have been printed since 1862, except for a 10-year hiatus between 1966 and 1976. The U.S. Treasury reports that  worth of  bills were in circulation worldwide as of April 30, 2007.

Unusual serial numbers (example: A11111111A) and replacement notes (known by collectors as "star notes" and designated by a star in the serial number) can raise the collector value of some bills. "Collectible" or "enhanced" two-dollar bills, commemorating America's national parks and other places, people, and events, have been made and sold by coin dealers and others in recent years merely by adding color, special graphics or color printed plastic overlays onto regular-issue $2 notes by using computer printers. The creators and marketers of many of these notes unscrupulously imply that they are authorized or issued by the federal government; however, no "collectible" or "enhanced" two-dollar bills have been authorized by the United States Treasury, the Bureau of Engraving and Printing, nor any other government agency and the bills have no value above their  face on the collectors' market.

Certain conventions and tourism/convention bureaus capitalize on the scarcity of  notes in circulation, encouraging convention attendees and tourists to spend the bills to illustrate to the host communities the economic impact that the conventions and tourism bring. Sometimes known as "SpendTom" campaigns, the  bills linger in the community as a constant reminder. Some campaigns encourage people to participate in a hunt for the bills to win prizes.

History

Large-sized notes
(  ≅ )

In March 1862, the first $2 bill was issued as a Legal Tender Note (United States Note) with a portrait of Alexander Hamilton; the portrait of Hamilton used was a profile view, different from the familiar portrait in use on the small-sized $10 bill since 1928.

By 1869, the $2 United States Note was redesigned with the now-familiar portrait of Thomas Jefferson to the left and a vignette of the United States Capitol in the center of the obverse. This note also featured green tinting on the top and left side of the obverse. The reverse was completely redesigned. This note with the red floral design was also issued as Series of 1917 but with red serial numbers by that time.

National Bank Notes were issued in 1875 and feature a woman unfurling a flag and a large sideways '2' ("Lazy Duce") on the obverse. The reverse has the king of England smoking tobacco and an eagle with a shield. In 1886, the first $2 silver certificate with a portrait of United States Civil War General Winfield Scott Hancock on the left of the obverse was issued. This design continued until 1891 when a new $2 Silver Certificate was issued with a portrait of U.S. Treasury Secretary William Windom in the center of the obverse.
Two-dollar Treasury, or "Coin", Notes were first issued for government purchases of silver bullion in 1890 from the silver mining industry. In 1891, the reverse of the Series of 1890 Treasury Note was redesigned because the treasury felt that it was too "busy", making it too easy to counterfeit. More open space was incorporated into the new design.

In 1896, the "Educational Series" Silver Certificate was issued. The entire obverse of the note was covered in artwork with an allegorical figure of science presenting steam and electricity to commerce and manufacture. The reverse of the note featured portraits of Robert Fulton and Samuel F. B. Morse surrounded by an ornate design that occupied almost the entire note.
By 1899, however, The $2 Silver Certificate was redesigned with a small portrait of George Washington surrounded by allegorical figures representing agriculture and mechanics.
Large-sized Federal Reserve Bank Notes were issued in 1918. Each note was an obligation of the issuing Federal Reserve Bank and could only be redeemed at the corresponding bank. The obverse of the note featured a borderless portrait of Thomas Jefferson to left and wording in the entire center. The reverse featured a World War I battleship.

Small size notes
( ≅ )

1928–1966

In 1928, when all U.S. currency was changed to its current size, the  bill was issued only as a United States Note. The obverse featured a cropped version of Thomas Jefferson's portrait that had been on previous  bills. The reverse featured Jefferson's home, Monticello. As with all United States Notes the treasury seal and serial numbers were red. The Series of 1928  bill featured the treasury seal superimposed by the United States Note obligation to the left and a large gray  to the right.

During the 1950s, production of  bills began to decrease. The relative scarcity of the notes led some to start saving any they received, with the inevitable result that the bills became less common in circulation.

In 1953, the  bill, along with the  United States Note, received minor design changes. The treasury seal was made smaller and moved to the right side of the bill; it was superimposed over the gray word . The United States Note obligation now became superimposed over a gray numeral 2. The reverse remained unchanged.

The final change to  United States Notes came in 1963 (as Series 1963) when the motto  was added to the reverse over the Monticello.
Further, because silver certificates were soon to be no longer redeemable in silver,  was removed from the obverse.

1976–current

Series 1976  bills were partially redesigned and reissued as a Federal Reserve Note. The note retains the same portrait of Jefferson, and the basic design of the obverse remains unchanged since 1928. The treasury seal and serial numbers are printed in green ink, replacing the red used on the previous United States Note. Since the reintroduction of the note coincided with the United States Bicentennial, it was decided to use a bicentennial-themed design on the reverse. The bill was not issued specifically to celebrate the bicenntenial, as is widely assumed. An engraved rendition (not an exact reproduction) of John Trumbull's Declaration of Independence replaced Monticello on the reverse. First-day issues of the new  bills could be taken to a post office and stamped with the date "APR 13 1976". The BEP produced a total of 590,720,000 notes from Series 1976, the final run printed in 1978.

Currently, stamped Series 1976  notes typically trade for about twice their face value. If the bills were stamped in a city with an unusual name, the value may be slightly higher. However, no first-day-issued 1976  bills with postage stamps are especially rare or valuable.

Despite their age, crisp, uncirculated Series 1976  notes are not uncommon and are not particularly valuable. More than half a billion series 1976  notes were printed and a very large number were saved and hoarded upon their original issue. A typical, single uncirculated 1976  bill is worth only slightly above  face value. An average circulated Series 1976 note has no additional value above its  face.

In 1996 and 1997, 153,600,000 bills were printed as Series 1995 for the Federal Reserve District of Atlanta. Beginning with Series 1995, all  notes have been produced at the Western Currency Facility in Fort Worth, Texas. In 2004, 121,600,000 of the Series 2003 bills were printed for the Federal Reserve District of Minneapolis. An issue of Series 2003A  bills was printed from July to September 2006 for all twelve Federal Reserve Banks. In all, 220,800,000 notes were printed.

In February 2012, the BEP printed 512,000 Series 2009  Star Notes, in anticipation of more regular runs being printed later in 2012. Series 2009  bills were issued to banks during the autumn of 2012.

In November 2013, the BEP began printing Series 2013  notes for the Federal Reserve Bank of Atlanta; these notes entered circulation in early 2014. A total of 44,800,000 notes were ordered for fiscal year 2014, which ran from October 2013 through September 2014. Series 2017A  notes were first issued to banks in December 2019.

Series dates

Large size

Small size

 These are sourced by The Official Red Book (Whitman).

Visual chronology
A chronological display of the American two-dollar bill.

Usage

Because $2 bills are uncommon in daily use, their use can make a particular group of spenders visible. A documented case of using two-dollar bills to send a message to a community is the case of Geneva Steel and the communities in the surrounding Utah County. In 1989, Geneva Steel paid its employee bonuses in $2 bills. When the bills began to appear in different places, people recognized the importance of the company to the local economy.

Use of the $2 bill is also being suggested by some gun rights activists to show support for Second Amendment rights, particularly at stores that allow open carry or concealed carry of weapons on their premises. Two-dollar notes have also seen increased usage in situations where tipping is encouraged, especially in gentlemen's clubs. This is due to the idea that tips will increase because of the ease of use of a single, higher-denomination bill as the lowest common note in use.

The use of the $2 bill is popular among fans and alumni of Clemson University, who often bring notes with them when traveling to university athletic events in other localities as a demonstration of their economic impact in an area. The idea was first popularized in 1977 when Georgia Tech had threatened to no longer play the Tigers in football and has since caught on as a token of fandom when traveling to other locations. Fans will often stamp an orange tiger paw (Clemson's logo) on the note as a sign of its origin.

During the 1930s, the $2 bill was often used at East Coast horse race tracks to make a bet. Because of the German and Jewish influence, the bill was locally known in parts of New Jersey as a "zwei-buck", and the upper right corner "2" was sometimes torn off to increase the luck.

As of October 2013, MetroBuses in Greater St. Louis do not accept $2 bills.

In recent years, some individuals have become 'ambassadors' for the two-dollar bill in an effort to popularize its use in everyday transactions by using them as often as possible, adding large numbers of the notes into circulation in the process.

Incidents

The relative scarcity of the $2 bill in everyday circulation has led to confusion at points of sale, as well as overreaction by merchants and even attempted prosecution of the individual trying to tender the bill.

In 2005, a man in Baltimore, Maryland, was jailed for attempting to use $2 bills that the store and local police incorrectly thought were counterfeit because of smeared ink on some of the bills.

In 2016, a 13-year-old girl in Texas was detained by police for attempting to use a $2 bill to pay for lunch in her school's cafeteria. The bill, a series 1953 red seal, while still legal tender, was old enough that the school's counterfeit pen would not work on it, as the chemical properties of the paper used for United States currency prior to 1960 are such that a counterfeit pen is unable to prove whether or not the bill is genuine.

Uncut currency sheets

Alongside other denominations, uncut currency sheets of  bills are available from the Bureau of Engraving and Printing. Some of the recent  uncut sheets from Series 1995 and Series 2003 have been collectibles as they come from special non-circulation printings. Most of the Series 1995  uncut sheets had a higher suffix letter in the serial number than regular circulation  bills.

In late 1999, to celebrate the new millennium, a unique run of 9,999 Series 1995  star notes were printed for all twelve Federal Reserve Banks; the initial printing of Series 1995  notes for circulation was for the Atlanta district (F) only. Uncut  sheets from Series 2003 were printed for the Boston (A), New York (B), Atlanta (F), Chicago (G), Minneapolis (I), and Dallas (K) Federal Reserve districts; notes from the Minneapolis district were the only ones released for circulation. Uncut sheets of Series 2003A have also been produced, although in this case circulating currency for all twelve districts has also been made. All  notes beginning with Series 1995 have been printed in the BEP facility in Fort Worth, Texas, (indicated by "FW" preceding the face plate number on the obverse of the note).
Uncut sheets of  bills are available in various sizes. A 32-subject sheet, which is the original-size sheet on which the notes are printed, is available. Other sheet sizes available have been cut from the original 32-subject sheet. These include half (sixteen-note), quarter (eight-note), and eighth (four-note) sheets for  bills. Uncut sheets are sold for more than their respective face values.
Uncut sheets of large size notes (issued before 1928) also exist, but are extremely rare.

See also
Japanese 2000 yen banknote - another banknote denomination of roughly ten times the value that is similarly rarely seen in circulation and likewise available upon request from banks.

References
Citations

General

 
 
 The Bureau of Engraving and Printing website 
 USpapermoney.info

External links

 $2 Notes, U.S. Currency Education
 The U.S. Bureau of Engraving and Printing's website 
 The Two Dollar Bill project teaches Americans about the history of the $2 bill 

1862 introductions
002
Cultural depictions of Thomas Jefferson
Two-base-unit banknotes
United States Declaration of Independence